Friendly Fire is the second studio album by Sean Lennon, released on 2 October 2006 by Capitol Records in the US, and Parlophone in the UK. It reached #152 on the US Billboard 200 chart and #5 in the Top Heatseekers chart. It stayed on the French album chart for 43 weeks and was certified silver.

Background
The inspiration behind most of the songs on Friendly Fire was Lennon's tumultuous relationship with actress Bijou Phillips. According to Lennon, Phillips cheated on him with his childhood best friend, Max LeRoy; LeRoy died shortly afterwards in a motorcycle accident, before he and Lennon were able to resolve their differences.

Track listing
All songs written by Sean Lennon, except where noted.

"Dead Meat" - 3:37
"Wait for Me" - 2:39
"Parachute" - 3:19
"Friendly Fire" - 5:03
"Spectacle" (Lennon, Jordan Galland) - 5:24
"Tomorrow" - 2:03
"On Again Off Again" - 3:18
"Headlights" - 3:16
"Would I Be the One" (Marc Bolan) - 4:58
"Falling Out of Love" (Lennon, Galland) - 4:07

French 2007 reissue bonus track
"L'éclipse" (Duet with -M-, French version of "Parachute") (Lennon, -M-) - 3:16

Personnel
Sean Lennon - vocals, guitar, bass guitar, keyboards, drums
Harper Simon - guitar
Yuka Honda - bass guitar, keyboards
Jon Brion - guitar, Hammond organ, bass guitar, drums
Greg Kurstin - Hammond organ
Sebastian Steinberg - bass guitar
Jim Keltner, Matt Chamberlain - drums
Athena Legend, Bijou Phillips - backing vocals
Sean Lennon, Eric Gorfain - string arrangements

Chart positions

Certifications

Release details

References

External links
Friendly Fire at Metacritic.

Sean Lennon albums
2006 albums
Capitol Records albums
Parlophone albums
EMI Records albums